Gonzalo Núñez de Novoa (died 16 May 1332) was a Roman Catholic prelate who served as Bishop of Orense (1319–1332).

Biography
On 25 September 1319, Gonzalo Núñez de Novoa was appointed during the papacy of Pope John XXII as Bishop of Orense. In 1320, he was consecrated bishop by Berenguel Landore, Archbishop of Santiago de Compostela with Pedro Méndez Sotomayor y Meiras, Bishop of Coria, and Bishop Pedro, Bishop of Salamanca, serving as co-consecrators. He served as Bishop of Orense until his death on 16 May 1332.

References

External links and additional sources
 (for Chronology of Bishops) 
 (for Chronology of Bishops) 

14th-century Roman Catholic bishops in Castile
1332 deaths
Bishops appointed by Pope John XXII